Sindhudurg Fort (Marathi pronunciation: [sin̪d̪ʱud̪uɾɡ]) is a historical fort that occupies an island in the Arabian Sea, just off the coast of Maharashtra in Western India. It is a protected monument.

History
Sindhudurg island-fort was built by Shivaji Maharaj, the 17th-century ruler of Maratha Empire. Its main objective was to counter the rising influence of foreign (English, Dutch, French and Portuguese) merchants and to curb the rise of Siddhis of Janjira. Construction was supervised by Hiroji Indulkar in 1664. The fort was built on a small island known as the Khurte island.

Structural details
Shivaji Maharaj had brought 200 Vaddera people to build this fort. Over 4,000 pounds of lead were used in the casting and foundation stones were firmly laid down. Construction started on 25 November 1664. The massive walls were designed to serve as a deterrent to approaching enemies and to the waves and tides of the Arabian Sea. The main entrance is concealed in such a way that no one can pinpoint it from outside.

At a time when traveling by sea was banned by scriptures, this construction on an island represents the revolutionary mindset of its engineer. A remain of an iron mould can be seen.

The number of permanent residents living in the fort has been in decline since its abandonment. Most residents have moved out due to inadequate employment opportunities but some families remain. The fort is closed for tourists during rainy season due to high tides.

Gallery

See also

 Maratha Navy
 List of forts in Maharashtra
 List of forts in Mumbai
 List of forts in India
 List of forts

References

Maratha Navy
Buildings and structures of the Maratha Empire
Forts in Maharashtra
Tourist attractions in Sindhudurg district
1656 establishments in Asia